Taşkıran is a Turkish surname. Notable people with the surname include:
 Berkay Taşkıran (born 1997), Turkish basketball player
 Celal Taşkıran (born 1954), Turkish wrestler
 Erkan Taşkıran (born 1985), Turkish footballer
 Ertuğrul Taşkıran (born 1989), Turkish footballer
 Tezer Taşkıran (1907–1979), Turkish–Azerbaijani writer, politician and teacher

Turkish-language surnames